Hucknall Town Football Club are a football club based in the town of Hucknall, Nottinghamshire, England.

History
Hucknall Town were renamed from Hucknall Colliery Welfare in 1987 and for the next two seasons finished first in the Notts Alliance.  They moved into the Central Midlands League where they finished first in both 1989–90 and 1990–91 and runners up in 1991–92 to Lincoln United.  The league cup was also won in all three seasons with the losing finalists being the now defunct Crookes, Nottingham neighbours Arnold Town and Nettleham.

Hucknall Town were promoted to the Northern Counties East League Division One and then to the Premier Division where they struggled in the Premier Division until 1996–97, when they recovered from a poor start to finish sixth. However, the League Cup and President's Cup made their way to Watnall Road with Hucknall beating Pontefract Colleries and Belper Town in the respective finals. It was the second time they had won the League Cup, having beaten Thackley in 1994.

In 1997–98, they won the Northern Counties East League and retained the league cup with North Ferriby United finishing second in both competitions. The following season came as a major surprise as Hucknall finished second in the Division One, behind Droylsden. The title would have been won but for an early season points deduction.

From 1999 to 2004 they played in the Northern Premier League Premier Division, winning the championship in the 2003–04 season. However, as their Watnall Road ground did not meet the standards of the Football Conference they were refused promotion to the Conference National division and had to settle for a place in the new Conference North.

They were due to be relegated from the Conference North to the Northern Premier League Premier Division following the 2007–08 season. This would have been the first relegation from any league in the club's history.  However, Halifax Town's financial woes meant that they were reprieved. The club were eventually relegated at the end of the 2008–09 season.

Relegation following the 2010–2011 season saw them drop into the Division One South and further financial woes lead to them relegated again, three levels in 2012–13 to Central Midlands League South Division.

In the 2014–15 season Hucknall Town finished 4th in the Central Midlands League and won the Central Midland League Cup, beating Clifton All Whites 3–0 at Alfreton Town's Impact Arena. 

Hucknall Town became Central Midlands League South divisional champions in the 2018–19 season.

Stadium
The club played at the Watnall Road ground, which has a 5,000 capacity with 270 seats with the development side. Hucknall Town Sunday and the Vet's team also played home fixtures at Watnall Road on the training pitch.

In May 2008, Worksop Town of the Northern Premier League became Hucknall's tenants, although the agreement was not renewed after the 2008–09 season.

In May 2015, it was announced that work had started on a new stadium.  The club had hoped to move into the new stadium just off Aerial Way (across the road from the current stadium) for the 2017–18 season.

First Team squad

Reserve Squad

Managers
The manager from 1995 to 2001 as Town rose from the Northern Counties East League to the Northern Premier League Premier Division was Geordie John Ramshaw.  He was followed by Phil Starbuck and then Steve Burr.  Former Leek Town and Gainsborough Trinity boss Ernie Moss was manager for a short spell during the first part of the 2004–05 season.

Former Bury player Dean Barrick was player-manager until January 2006. Dean Barrick was popular amongst the club's fans, and was voted BBC Radio Nottingham Sports Personality of the year in 2005 having led the club to the FA Trophy final.

Barrick was replaced in February 2006 by Kevin Wilson, the former Northampton Town and Kettering Town manager.

In January 2007, Wilson was sacked as manager, and former Welsh international player Andy Legg was appointed as the new player-manager.  Legg remained as manager until September 2007, when he resigned following six consecutive defeats at the start of the season.  David Lloyd replaced Legg, but having failed to avoid a relegation position was sacked before the final game of the 2007–08 season and replaced by Mick Galloway and Andy Miller.
In November 2008 former Eastwood Town manager Brian Chambers was appointed as Director of Football.  Galloway and Miller were appointed as coaches. However, the clubs stated that he was to work with Galloway, rather than replace him. Although after a further defeat against King's Lynn, Galloway and Miller were dismissed and replaced by Chambers Chambers resigned as manager in January 2010

In May 2022 Andy Graves the clubs longest serving manager resigned following defeat in United Counties Division One play off semi-final against Hinckley A.F.C..

Honours
FA Trophy 
Runners-up 2004–05
Northern Premier League
Premier Division champions 2003–04
Chairman's Cup winners 2002–03
Division One runners-up 1998–99
Northern Counties East League
Premier Division champions 1997–98
League Cup winners 1993–94, 1996–97, 1997–98
Presidents Cup winners 1996–97
Central Midlands League
Supreme Division champions 1989–90, 1990–91
South Division champions 2018–19
Supreme Division runners-up 1991–92
League Cup winners 1989–90, 1990–91, 1991–92, 2014–15
League Cup runners-up 2016–17, 2018–19
Reserve League Champions 2015–16
Reserve League Cup winners 2015–16
Nottinghamshire Alliance
Senior Division champions 1976–77, 1977–78, 1987–88, 1988–89
Division One champions 1972–73, 1980–81, 1986–87 (all but 1972-73 by reserve team)
Division Two champions 1970–71
Intermediate Cup winners 1972–73, 1978–79, 1979–80, 1980–81, 1983–84 (all but 1972-73 by reserve team)
League Cup winners 1978–79
Nottinghamshire Senior Cup
Winners 1984–85, 1990–91, 1997–98, 1999–00, 2000–01, 2002–03
Runners-up 1989–90, 1998–99
Notts Intermediate Cup
Winners 1987–88, 1997–98 (both reserve team)
Notts Junior Cup
Winners 1963

Notable former players

Several players have gone on to play in the Football League:
 Danny Bacon; Lincoln City.
 Saul Deeney; Derby County
 Terry Hawkridge; Notts County, Mansfield Town and Scunthorpe United
 Liam Hearn; Mansfield Town.
 Leon McSweeney; Stockport County, Hartlepool United and Leyton Orient via Cork City.
 Stuart Nelson; Brentford, Leyton Orient, Norwich City. and Gillingham, Aberdeen and Notts County.
 Junior Ogedi-Uzokwe; Colchester United and Derry City
 Andy Todd; Accrington Stanley, Rotherham United and Mansfield Town
 Andy White; Boston United, Crewe Alexandra, Kidderminster Harriers, Mansfield Town and Notts County, last at Worksop Town.

References

External links

Club website

 
National League (English football) clubs
Football clubs in England
1943 establishments in England
Northern Premier League clubs
Central Midlands Football League
Northern Counties East Football League
East Midlands Regional League
Association football clubs established in 1943
East Midlands Counties Football League
Mining association football teams in England
United Counties League